Georgina Norway (18331915), was a British writer of children's adventure fiction.

Early life
Georgina Shute was born on 2 December 1833 in Liverpool to merchant Stephen Shute and his wife Georgina (née Bunt) of Finch Street, Liverpool. She was baptised a month later, on 4 January 1834, in the Renshaw Street Presbyterian Chapel in Liverpool.

Marriage and writing
Georgina married Arthur Stanbury Norway in Farnworth Parish Church, Prescot, near Bolton, Lancashire on 24 September 1857. The couple had two sons, Nevell Edmund (5 August 185824 October 1902), a surgeon, and Arthur Hamilton (185925 December 1938), who worked for the Post Office.

Norway's husband Arthur was declared bankrupt and had trustee assigned on 22 June 1864. The bankruptcy dragged on for the nest two and a half years, with the final distribution of the assets only in December 1867. The family kept two adult servants at the time of the 1861 census, one adult servant by 1871, and had only a 10-year-old girl by 1881. Arthur died in 1886, and Georgina began to write, publishing her first novel, The Brand of Cain in 1888. Norway was living with her sons in Ealing in 1891, and the household now kept one adult (20) and one child servant (14).

Norway published under the name G. Norway. Bassett says that she so successfully concealed her gender that many sources refer to her as George Norway. However, both The Atheneum and The Review of Reviews when reviewing A true Cornish Maid refer to the author as Mrs. Norway, so her gender was not a secret. However, The Standard used the male pronoun to refer to the author, so it was clear that Norway's gender, while not a secret, was not broadcast.

Norways's books were well reviewed at the time. The Standard said of The Loss of John Humble, her first full-length novel, that This story will palace the author at once in the front rank. It is full of life and adventure. The interest of the story is sustained without a break from first to last. and The Spectator said A very spirited story of the sea interspersed with pleasant and lively sketches of Scandinavian manners . . . As good a story of the kind as we have ever seen.

Personal life
As well as Norway, Her son Arthur Hamilton was also a writer, and his son was the novelist Nevil Shute. Nevil Shute paid his grandmother the compliment of borrowing the name of one of her characters Johnnie Pascoe for one of his characters. In his 1954 autobiography, Slide Rule Nevil Shute acknowledged the influence that his father and grandmother had had on him thus: I don't think there is a great deal in the theory that writing ability is dictated by heredity, but I think there is a great deal in environment. My father and my grandmother both wrote a number of books, so that the business was familiar to me before I started.

Norway was a boarder with the Hills of 75 Haven Lane, Ealing in 1911, but moved to Ireland after her youngest son, Arthur Hamilton Norway, was placed in charge of the Post Office in Ireland in 1912. She died in Killiney, Dublin, Ireland, on 3 March 1915, leaving an estate of £556 to her son Arthur.

Selected works

Notes

References

External links

English historical novelists
19th-century English novelists
Victorian novelists
Writers of historical fiction set in the early modern period
Writers from Liverpool

British children's writers
British women children's writers
1833 births
1915 deaths